Annelies Van Doorslaer (born 15 January 1989) is a Belgian former racing cyclist. She competed in the 2013 UCI women's road race in Florence.

Major results

2012
 9th Holland Hills Classic
2014
 5th Erondegemse Pijl
2015
 1st Time trial, Flemish Brabant Provincial Road Championships
 8th Erondegemse Pijl

See also
 2009 Lotto-Belisol Ladiesteam season

References

External links

1989 births
Living people
Belgian female cyclists
Cyclists from Antwerp